Ramakrishnapuram (or RK Puram ) is a locality in Neredmet, (Earlier it was a hamlet and then it as became a small town in Old Neredmet Village.

It falls under Malkajgiri mandal of Medchal-Malkajgiri district of Indian State of Telangana. In the past 15 years, this suburb has become an important residential area in the twin cities. Many colonies, townships and apartments came up in this suburb.

History 
RK Puram lake's also Known as Mukidigan Cheruvu (Original Name) roots can be traced back to 1798 when the 'subsidiary alliance' was proposed by then British Governor-General in India, Lord Wellesley.

By the early 1800s, the Electronics and Mechanical Engineering (EME), which is presently the Military College of Electronics and Mechanical Engineering (MCEME), had been set up at Trimulgherry. The engineers and electricians who worked here needed water, So RK Puram Lake was commissioned by the Nizam and dug up in the mid-1800s, occupying a space of around 100 acres.

There is no established date for when the RK Puram lake was dug up, but its roots can be traced back to 1798 when the 'subsidiary alliance' was proposed by then British Governor-General in India, Lord Wellesley.

As part of the alliance, the East India Company offered protection to the rulers of princely states, in exchange for money or land. 

Nizam Sikander Jah, the third ruler from the Asaf Jahi dynasty, was said to be one of the first princely states to sign the pact.

At this time, Secunderabad was a small taluk, described as a low flat ridge, near a village north of the Hussain Sagar Lake. It was here that the British built the cantonment area. 

Speaking to TNM, Murali Chemuturi, a writer and long-time resident of the area, narrates, “Mudfort, which is now just the name of an area, was the first place where the East India Company built its garrison. Over time, the garrison expanded, and soon it had spread all the way up to Bolaram.”

By the early 1800s, the Electronics and Mechanical Engineering (EME), which is presently the Military College of Electronics and Mechanical Engineering (MCEME), had been set up. 

Though it is now a populated area in the city, this was the time that people first settled in then Neredmet village.  

“The engineers and electricians who worked there needed two main services. First, they had dry toilets and needed someone for manual scavenging, and secondly, they needed milk and food. For the first, they hired some Scheduled Caste people from Tamil Nadu and for the second purpose, they hired Yadavs (a cattle-breeding caste), from Uttar Pradesh,” Murali says. 

“The two groups were housed nearby, and while Neredmet became the village
RK Puram was the hamlet where the SC persons stayed,” he adds.

All three of these groups needed water, so the RK Puram Lake was commissioned by the Nizam and dug up in the mid-1800s, occupying a space of around 100 acres.

After the sepoy mutiny in 1857, the British continued to expand aggressively, and the area's population began to grow. 

The lake remained a major source of drinking water and largely clean, until the late 1960s, when the Electronics Corporation of India Limited (ECIL) was established. 

“There was no shortage of water, which is why the old houses in RK Puram have no well or borewell. In 1965, Sainik Nagar was the first colony to be allotted. Despite this, the lake remained clean, as the colony remained downstream of the lake,” says Murali.

“After ECIL came up, the politicians of the time laid a road right through the lake, to create a shortcut. In 1976, the lake flooded the road, following which it was raised by 5 feet by the gram panchayat with the help of mud and stones,” he adds.

According to locals, this was when a large portion of the lake was killed, as the water that was cut off from the rest of the lake, was eventually dumped with debris and flattened.

“However, it was only in the mid-80s that things started going downhill, as several colonies like GK Colony, Sri Colony, Bank Colony and Bhagat Singh Nagar were built upstream, and untreated sewage started flowing directly into the lake,” Murali says.

Localities in RK PURAM
Neredmet village is earlier Consists of Ramakrishnapuram and Safilgudem Hamlet villages. Now they totally merged in it.

The Old Hamlet of Neredmet Village is known as RK Puram (Ramakrishnapuram). Colonies in RK Puram include.

Listed below are some popular and developed colonies in R K Puram also known as Ramakrishnapuram.
RK Puram (Ramakrishnapuram Hamlet) Village,
Sapthagiri Colony, 
Bharani Colony, 
Chandra Babu Naidu Colony, 
Raghavendra Nagar, 
Matrupuri Colony,
 GK Colony, 
Brundavan Colony, 
Prem Nagar, 
Ananthaiah Colony, 
Santhosh Colony, 
Balaji Colony, 
Sri Venkateshwara Officers Colony, 
Asha Officers Colony, 
Shakthi Nagar, 
Gandhi Nagar, 
Anantha Saraswathi Colony, 
Brindavan Colony.
 Balaji Nagar.

Services

Schools 

 Army Public School RK Pruam.
 St.Mother Teresa High School, R.K.Puram
Little Diamond High School, RK.Puram

Lakes and Water Parks 

  Ramakrishnapuram Mukidigan Cheruvu

Transport

Bus Stops 
R K Puram is well connected by TSRTC city bus services with Secunderabad. Tirumalagiri and ECIL X Roads, by RK Puram Bus Stop and R K Puram Rythu Bazar Bus Stop.

Railways 
It is connected by suburban rail system, by Ramakistapuram Gate Railway Station.

Metro 
Nearest Hyderabad Metro station is Parade Grounds metro station.

References 

Villages in Medchal–Malkajgiri district